Parmananthan "Prema" Naidoo (born Doornfontein, Johannesburg, 30 May 1945) is a member of the African National Congress and former Chief Whip of Council and of the majority party in the Johannesburg Metro.

A leading anti-apartheid organiser in the 1970s, Naidoo was detained on 21 November 1981, under the Internal Security Act, and subjected to beatings and torture. After months in detention he was tried and sentenced on 1 April 1982 to an effective further year in prison on the charge of harbouring Stephen Lee, an escaped convict. Lee and two other political prisoners, Tim Jenkin and Alex Moumbaris, had escaped from the Pretoria Maximum Security Prison

On his release in 1983, Naidoo took part in the formation of the United Democratic Front and was detained again for eight months during the State of Emergency of 1985. After the first non-racial elections of 1994, Naidoo served in senior local authority positions in Johannesburg, until his retirement in 2016. He is presently a member of the board of the Ahmed Kathrada Foundation.

Prema Naidoo is the son of Roy Naidoo and Manonmoney “Ama” Naidoo, grandson of Thambi Naidoo, and brother of Shanthie Naidoo, Indres Naidoo, Murthie Naidoo, Ramnie Dinat.

References 

1945 births
Living people
Anti-apartheid activists
South African politicians
South African activists
Recipients of Pravasi Bharatiya Samman